Calypso Carnival is a studio album by Harry Belafonte, released by RCA Records in 1971. This was Belafonte's fifth and final Calypso album.

Track listing 
 "Don't Stop the Carnival" – 5:00
 "Chinita" (Ralph MacDonald, William Salter) – 3:29
 "Trinidad Carnival Time" (MacDonald, Salter, Primes) – 4:12
 "Lena" – 3:33
 "Black And White (Together)" (MacDonald) – 3:14
 "Out De Fire" – 3:45
 "Season for Carnival" (MacDonald, Sealy) – 3:53
 "Custer's Last Stand" (Dickson, Hall, Gary Romero) – 3:51
 "Mango, Cocoanut, Sugar Cane" (MacDonald) – 4:04
 "Elegant Donkey (Jackass)" (MacDonald) – 3:07

Personnel 
 Harry Belafonte – vocals
 Arranged and conducted by Ralph MacDonald
Sivuca - Accordion
Production notes:
 Jack Pleis – producer
 Bob Simpson – engineer
 Ralph MacDonald  – arrangements
 Frankie Francis  – arrangements
 William Eaton  – arrangements

References 

1971 albums
Harry Belafonte albums
RCA Records albums
Albums arranged by Ralph MacDonald
Albums conducted by Ralph MacDonald
Albums produced by Jack Pleis